Bruno Cornillet (born 8 February 1963, in Lamballe, Côtes-d'Armor) is a French former professional road bicycle racer.

Major results

1984
 1st, Overall, Volta a la Comunitat Valenciana
 1st, Stage 1
1985
 1st, Stage 2, Paris–Bourges
1986
 1st, Chateauroux-Limoges
 1st, Stage 4, Tour de Romandie
1987
 1st, Stage 2, Critérium du Dauphiné Libéré
 1st, Stage 3, Postgirot Open
1989
 1st, Stage 6, Postgirot Open
 1st, Stage 4, Paris–Nice (Mt Faron)
1990
 1st, GP Ouest-France
 1st, Stage 2b, Tour of Ireland
1991
 1st, A Travers le Morbihan
 1st, Overall, Circuit de la Sarthe
 1st, Stage 2
 1st, Stage 4a
1992
 1st, Tour de Vendée
1993
 1st, Paris–Bourges

External links 

1963 births
Living people
People from Lamballe
French male cyclists
Sportspeople from Côtes-d'Armor
Cyclists from Brittany